Wilhelm von Rümann (11 November 1850 in Hanover – 6 February 1906 in Ajaccio) was a prominent German sculptor, based in Munich.

Life
Rümann was born in Hanover. He studied from 1872 to 1874 at the Academy of Fine Arts, Munich (Akademie der Bildenden Künste München), and from 1880 with Michael Wagmüller. From 1887 he taught at the Academy of Fine Arts, Munich. In 1891 he was raised to the nobility.

As well as numerous funerary monuments in the Alter Südfriedhof (Old South Burial Ground) in Munich, he created sculptures which are still to be seen in the city: monuments for Georg Simon Ohm (1895, in the courtyard of the Technische Universität München), Max von Pettenkofer (1909) and Carl von Effner (1886) at the Maximiliansplatz (now the Lenbachplatz), the Puttenbrunnen (Putti Fountain) at the Peace Monument in the Prinzregentenstraße (originally intended for Schloss Herrenchiemsee) and the marble lions in front of the Feldherrnhalle (1906).

Among his pupils were Bernhard Bleeker, Emil Julius Epple, Jakob Hofmann, Moissey Kogan, Martin Scheible and Alois Mayer.

He died in Ajaccio, Corsica, and is buried in the Nordfriedhof ("Northern Cemetery"), Munich.

Works (public monuments) 

 Chemnitz:
 Kaiser Wilhelm I: equestrian statue in the market place; sent for scrap after 1945
 Bismarck Statue (1899), to the left; sent for scrap after 1945
 Moltke Statue, to the right; sent for scrap after 1945
 Heilbronn:
 Kaiser Wilhelm I Monument (1895), originally in front of the Harmonie Concert and Congress Centre, now in the Alter Friedhof (Old Graveyard) in the Weinsberger Straße
 Robert Mayer Statue, in the market place
Munich:
 Monument of Georg Simon Ohm, 1895
 Funerary monument of Princess Ludovika of Bavaria
 Several statues of Prince Luitpold of Bavaria, the Prince Regent, including one in the south-west of Siedlung Neuhausen
 Bust of Princess Theresa of Bavaria (in the Bavarian Academy of Sciences and Humanities)
 Bust of Wilhelm Bauer in the Deutsches Museum
 and many others
 Nuremberg:
 Kaiser Wilhelm I equestrian statue (1905) (designed and begun by Syrius Eberle, who died in 1903; completed by Rümann), Egidienplatz, in front of the Pellerhaus
 Statue of Prince Regent Luitpold (1901), station forecourt, removed in 1934, melted down in 1939
 Stuttgart:
 Kaiser Wilhelm I equestrian statue (1898)
 Bad Urach: bust of Bismarck in the Schloßstraße
 Woerth, Alsace, France: Bavarian National War Memorial 1870, made 1889

Gallery

Notes and references

Sources 
 Rümann, Wilhelm von. In: Ulrich Thieme, Felix Becker u. a.: Allgemeines Lexikon der Bildenden Künstler von der Antike bis zur Gegenwart. Band 29, E. A. Seemann, Leipzig 1935
  Matrikeldatenbank der Akademie der Bildenden Künste: Wilhelm von Rümann (1850–1906)

External links 

Artists from Hanover
Artists from Munich
German sculptors
German male sculptors
1850 births
1906 deaths
Burials at the Nordfriedhof (Munich)